The London International Animation Festival is an annual animation festival founded in 2003 that takes place at the Barbican Centre in London in November and December. The annual 10-day Festival includes premieres, retrospectives, interviews with filmmakers, workshops, and a "Best of the Festival" screening.

Awards
Awards include:
 Best of the Festival Award
 Best British Film Award
 Best Sound Design Award
 Best Abstract Film Award

In 2019 the LIAF will take place from 29 November - 8 December 2019. The festival director is Nag Vladermersky.

See also
 BFI London Film Festival
 British Animation Film Festival
 London Film Week
 London Independent Film Festival
 London Short Film Festival
 UK Film Festival

References

External links
 Official site Retrieved 12 March 2019

Film festivals in London
Animation film festivals in the United Kingdom